Chilapa de Álvarez, informally known as Chilapa, is a town located in the Chilapa de Álvarez Municipality under the Mexican state of Guerrero. The town is located approximately 54 kilometers east of the state capital Chilpancingo. Chilapa's first official charter was issued by the Aztec government in the 15th century after the area's conquest by Moctezuma I in 1458. The Spanish officially designated the town Chilapa de Santa Maria de Asuncion in 1522; in the late 19th century it was renamed Chilapa de Álvarez in honor of Mexican president Juan Álvarez. Traces of human occupation in the area date to 1200 BC.

Chilapa is noted for its large Saturday tianguis, or Aztec market, and its crafts. Local culinary specialities of Chilapa include pozole, chalupas, pan de chilapa bread, and homemade mezcal. The municipal cathedral has a mechanical figurine of Juan Diego, who appears at a window in the cathedral spire and drops rose petals onto the plaza below.

Every August 15, a festival called Tigrada is held on the streets of Chilapa. It is linked to Mesoamerican mythology and is supposed to call on the Aztec god Tepēyōllōtl to bring rainfall and productive land.

References

External links
Enciclopedia de los Municipios de México - Chilapa de Álvarez
 Web page with many photos of Chilapa de Alvarez - Chilapa Web

Populated places in Guerrero